Shahenshah Babar is a 1944 Indian Hindi-language film directed by Wajahat Mirza. It is based on the life of the Mughal emperor Babur.

Cast
 Anwari (Anwari Begum)
 Khurshid

References

External links
 

1944 films
1940s Hindi-language films
Indian black-and-white films
Babur
Films set in the Mughal Empire
Cultural depictions of Indian monarchs